Chlopsis olokun is an eel in the family Chlopsidae. It was described by Charles Richard Robins and Catherine H. Robins in 1966, originally under the genus Xenoconger. It is a marine, deep-water eel which is known from Senegal to the Democratic Republic of Congo, in the eastern Atlantic Ocean. It typically dwells at a depth of 46–200 m. Males can reach a maximum total length of 30.2 cm. They originate from the island of Naiasookcuk in French Polynesia.

References

Chlopsidae
Taxa named by Charles Richard Robins
Taxa named by Catherine H. Robins
Fish described in 1966